High Roller is a wooden roller coaster located at Valleyfair in Shakopee, Minnesota.  High Roller is Valleyfair's oldest roller coaster, being built in 1976 when the park opened.  It is an out-and-back type coaster, and is 70 feet (21 m) at the highest peak with a top speed of 50 mph (80 km/h).

It is a common misperception that High Roller is really the Cyclone from nearby Excelsior Amusement Park, which closed a few years before Valleyfair opened. However, this is not the case.  While High Roller bears some similarities to Cyclone, it was a brand new ride in 1976, and Cyclone was demolished when the Excelsior park closed.

External links
Official page

Roller coasters introduced in 1976
Roller coasters operated by Cedar Fair
Roller coasters in Minnesota
Valleyfair